Llampha (also Lampha) is a hamlet in the Vale of Glamorgan, South Wales, near Bridgend. It mainly consists of farms and small holdings. It is in the historic county of Glamorgan.

External links 

www.geograph.co.uk : photos of Llampha and surrounding area

Villages in the Vale of Glamorgan